The Croatian Hockey League Season for 1999-2000 resulted with KHL Medveščak winning the title for the fourth time in a row.

Teams
 KHL Mladost
 KHL Medveščak Zagreb
 KHL Zagreb
 HK Ina Sisak

Regular season

Playoffs

Semifinals
The semifinals on 13 and 16 February. 
Medvescak beat Sisak 2–0 in a best of three series. (10–4) and (5–0 (forfeit))
Zagreb beat Mladost in a best of three series. (8–4) and (8–1)

Finals
Medvescak swept Zagreb in a best of five series, by 3–0. 
KHL Medvešcak – KHL Zagreb (5–1) (5–2) (4–3)

Croatian Ice Hockey League
1
Croatian Ice Hockey League seasons